The 1908 All-Ireland Senior Football Championship Final was the 21st All-Ireland Final and the deciding match of the 1908 All-Ireland Senior Football Championship, an inter-county Gaelic football tournament for the top teams in Ireland.

Dublin won easily, despite having a player sent off after 25 minutes.

It was the fifth of five All-Ireland football titles won by Dublin in the 1900s.

References

Gaelic football
All-Ireland Senior Football Championship Finals
Dublin county football team matches
London county football team matches